Irène Némirovsky (11 February 1903 – 17 August 1942) was a novelist of Ukrainian Jewish origin who was born in Kyiv, the Russian Empire. She lived more than half her life in France, and wrote in French, but was denied French citizenship. Arrested as a Jew under the racial lawswhich did not take into account her conversion to Roman Catholicismshe was murdered in Auschwitz at the age of 39. Némirovsky is best known for the posthumously published Suite française.

Life and career
Némirovsky was born Irina Lvivna Nemirovska in 1903 in Kyiv, then Russian Empire, the daughter of a wealthy banker, Léon (Lev) Némirovsky. Her volatile and unhappy relationship with her mother became the heart of many of her novels.

Her family fled the Russian Empire at the start of the Russian Revolution in 1917, spending a year in Finland in 1918 and then settling in Paris, where Némirovsky attended the Sorbonne and began writing when she was 18 years old.

In 1926, Némirovsky married Michel Epstein, a banker, and had two daughters: Denise, born in 1929; and Élisabeth, in 1937.

In 1929, she published David Golder, the story of a Jewish banker unable to please his troubled daughter, which was an immediate success, and was adapted to the big screen by Julien Duvivier in 1930, with Harry Baur as David Golder. In 1930, her novel Le Bal, the story of a mistreated daughter and the revenge of a teenager, became a play and a movie.

The David Golder manuscript was sent by post to the Grasset publisher with a poste restante address and signed Epstein. H. Muller, a reader for Grasset immediately tried to find the author but couldn't get hold of him/her. Grasset put an ad in the newspapers hoping to find the author, but the author was busy: she was having her first child, Denise. When Némirovsky finally showed up as the author of David Golder, the unverified story is that the publisher was surprised that such a young woman was able to write such a powerful book.

Although she was widely recognized as a major authoreven by some anti-Semitic writers like Robert BrasillachFrench citizenship was denied to the Némirovskys in 1938.

Némirovsky was of Russian-Jewish origin, but was baptized into the Roman Catholic Church in 1939 and wrote in Candide and Gringoire, two magazines with ultra-nationalist tendencies. After the war started, Gringoire was the only magazine that continued to publish her work, thus "guarantee[ing] Némirovsky's family some desperately needed income".

By 1940, Némirovsky's husband was unable to continue working at the bank, and Némirovsky's books could no longer be published, because of her Jewish ancestry. Upon the Nazis' approach to Paris, they fled with their two daughters to the village of Issy-l'Evêque (the Némirovskys initially sent them to live with their nanny's family in Burgundy, while staying on in Paris themselves; they had already lost their Russian home and refused to lose their home in France), where Némirovsky was required to wear the Yellow star.

On 13 July 1942, Némirovsky (then 39) was arrested as a "stateless person of Jewish descent" by policemen employed by Vichy France. As she was being taken away, she told her daughters, "I am going on a journey now." She was brought to a convoy assembly camp at Pithiviers, and on 17 July 1942, together with 928 other Jewish deportees, transported to the Nazi concentration camp Auschwitz, in Poland. Upon her arrival there two days later, her forearm was marked with an identification number. She died a month later of typhus. On 6 November 1942, her husband, Michel Epstein, was sent to Auschwitz and immediately murdered in the gas chambers.

Rediscovery
Némirovsky is now best known as the author of the unfinished Suite Française (Denoël, France, 2004, ; translation by Sandra Smith, Knopf, 2006), two novellas portraying life in France between 4 June 1940 and 1 July 1941, the period during which the Nazis occupied most of France. These works are considered remarkable because they were written during the actual period itself, and yet are the product of considered reflection, rather than just a journal of events, as might be expected considering the personal turmoil experienced by the author at the time.

Némirovsky's older daughter, Denise, kept the notebook containing the manuscript for Suite Française for fifty years without reading it, thinking it was a journal or diary of her mother's, which would be too painful to read. In the late 1990s, however, she made arrangements to donate her mother's papers to a French archive and decided to examine the notebook first. Upon discovering what it contained, she instead had it published in France, where it became a bestseller in 2004. It has since been translated into 38 languages and as of 2008 has sold 2.5 million copies.

The original manuscript has been given to the Institut mémoires de l'édition contemporaine (IMEC), and the novel has won the Prix Renaudotthe first time the prize has been awarded posthumously.

Némirovsky's surviving notes sketch a general outline of a story arc that was intended to include the two existing novellas, as well as three more to take place later during the war and at its end. She wrote that the rest of the work was "in limbo, and what limbo! It's really in the lap of the gods since it depends on what happens."

In a January 2006 interview with the BBC, her daughter, Denise, said, "For me, the greatest joy is knowing that the book is being read. It is an extraordinary feeling to have brought my mother back to life. It shows that the Nazis did not truly succeed in killing her. It is not vengeance, but it is a victory."

Controversy
Several reviewers and commentators have raised questions regarding Némirovsky's conversion to Catholicism, her generally negative depiction of Jews in her writing and her use of ultra-nationalist publications to provide for her family.

Myriam Anissimov's introduction to the French edition of Suite Française describes Némirovsky as a "self-hating Jew," due to the fact that Némirovsky's own situation as a Jew in France is not at all seen in the work. The paragraph was omitted from the English edition.

A long article in The Jewish Quarterly argued that there had been an "abdication of critical responsibility in exchange for the more sensational copy to be had from Némirovsky’s biography" by most reviewers in the British press.

Fire in the Blood
In 2007, another novel by Némirovsky was published, after a complete manuscript was found in her archives by two French biographers. Chaleur du sangtranslated to English by Sandra Smith as Fire in the Bloodis a tale of country folk in a Burgundy village, based on Issy-l'Évêque where Némirovsky and her family found temporary refuge while hiding from the Nazis.

Works published during the author's life
 L'Enfant génial (Éditions Fayard, 1927), was renamed by the publisher L'enfant prodige in 1992 with the approval of Némirovsky's daughters, because the French term génial had become widely used in slang (similar to awesome) and no longer had the same connotations.
 David Golder (Éditions Grasset, 1929) (translation by Sylvia Stuart published 1930; new translation by Sandra Smith published 2007)
 Le Bal (Éditions Grasset, 1930)
 Le malentendu (Éditions Fayard, 1930)
 Les Mouches d'automne (Éditions Grasset, 1931)
 L'Affaire Courilof (Éditions Grasset, 1933)
 Le Pion sur l'échiquier (Éditions Albin Michel, 1934)
 Films parlés (Éditions Nouvelle Revue Française, 1934)
 Le Vin de solitude (Éditions Albin Michel, 1935) (republished as "The Wine of Solitude" 2012, Vintage Books)
 Jézabel (Éditions Albin Michel, 1936) [translation by Barre Dunbar published in the U.S. as A Modern Jezebel by Henry Holt & Co., 1937; new translation by Sandra Smith published 2012, Vintage Books]
 La Proie (Éditions Albin Michel, 1938)
 Deux  (Éditions Albin Michel, 1939)
 Le maître des âmes (Revue Gringoire, 1939, published as weekly episodes)
 Les Chiens et les loups (Éditions Albin Michel, 1940)

Works published posthumously
 La Vie de Tchekhov (Éditions Albin Michel, 1946)
 Les Biens de ce monde (Éditions Albin Michel, 1947) (English translation published in 2011 by Vintage, translated as All Our Worldly Goods)
 Les Feux de l'automne (Éditions Albin Michel, 1957)
 Dimanche (short stories) (Éditions Stock, 2000) (English translation published in 2010 by Persephone Books)
 Destinées et autres nouvelles (Éditions Sables, 2004)
 Suite française (Éditions Denoël, 2004) Winner of the Renaudot prize 2004. English translation by Sandra Smith, published in Great Britain by Chatto & Windus, 2004, and in the U.S. by Alfred A. Knopf, 2006.
 Le maître des âmes (Éditions Denoël, 2005)
 Chaleur du sang (Éditions Denoël, 2007), English translation by Sandra Smith titled Fire in the Blood (Chatto & Windus, 2007)
 Les vierges et autres nouvelles, Éditions Denoël, 2009

Adaptations
 An opera made from the 1930 novel Le Bal was first performed in 2010 at the Hamburg Opera House, Germany (composed by Oscar Strasnoy, adapted by Matthew Jocelyn.) 
 A dramatization of the 1930 novel Le malentendu was broadcast by BBC Radio as The Misunderstanding in January 2019.

Biography
A biography of Némirovsky, Irene Nemirovsky: Her Life And Works, written by Jonathan Weiss, was published in 2006.

See also
 Hélène Berr – French diarist
 Hana Brady – Jewish girl and Holocaust victim; subject of the children's book Hana's Suitcase
 Helga Deen – wrote a diary in Herzogenbusch concentration camp (Camp Vught)
 Etty Hillesum – wrote a diary in Amsterdam and Camp Westerbork
 Věra Kohnová – Czech diarist
 David Koker – wrote a diary in Herzogenbusch concentration camp (Camp Vught)
 Janet Langhart – author of a one-act play, "Anne and Emmett"
 Rutka Laskier – Polish diarist
 Bruce Marshall – Scottish novelist; his life has parallels with Némirovsky's and his novel Yellow Tapers for Paris is similar to Suite Française
 Tanya Savicheva – Russian child diarist
 Sophie Scholl – German student executed by the Nazis
 Henio Zytomirski – Polish boy who was a Holocaust victim

References

Further reading
 Lise Jaillant, "A Masterpiece Ripped from Oblivion: Rediscovered Manuscripts and the Memory of the Holocaust in Contemporary France", Clio 39.3 (Summer 2010): 359–79.
 Olivier Philipponnat and Patrick Lienhardt, The Life of Irène Némirovsky: 1903–1942, London: Chatto & Windus, 2010. Translated by Euan Cameron. . Available in U. S. May 4, 2010.
 Jonathan Weiss, Irène Némirovsky: Her Life and Works, Stanford: Stanford University Press, 2006. .
 Élisabeth Gille, Le Mirador, Mémoires rêvées (by Nemirovsky's youngest daughter,  a "dreamed biography" of her mother), Presses de la Renaissance (1992), Available in English from Knopf, Fall 2006.
 

 
 Serge Klarsfeld, Le Memorial de la Deportation des Juifs de France, Paris, 1978. No pagination.
 Olivier Corpet and Garret White (editors), Woman of Letters: Irène Némirovsky and Suite Française (with a short story, "The Virgins" by Irène Némirovsky, Five Ties Publishing, September 1, 2008. .
 Angela Kershaw, Before Auschwitz: Irène Némirovsky and the Cultural Landscape of Inter-war France, Routledge, August 1, 2009. 
 Olivier Philipponnat, "The 'Ambiguities' of Irène Némirovsky" (review of Angela Kershaw's Before Auschwitz: Irène Némirovsky and the Cultural Landscape of Inter-war France, 18 April 2013, translated into English by Susannah Dale.

External links
 Website dedicated to Irène Némirovsky
  Site dédié à l'écrivain Irène Némirovsky
 Irene Nemirovsky at Random House Australia
  Université McGill: le roman selon les romanciers  Inventory and analysis of Irene Némirovsky's non-novelistic writings about novel
 Interview of Denise Epstein & Sandra Smith WAMU American University Radio
 Jewish Literary Review: "Tell the full story of Irène Némirovsky"
 Author Profile at Persephone Books 

Critical reviews of Suite Française
 
 Peter Kemp in The Times
 Andrew Riemer in The Sydney Morning Herald
 A review by: Paul La Farge

1903 births
1942 deaths
Writers from Kyiv
French Roman Catholics
French women novelists
Converts to Roman Catholicism from Judaism
Jewish novelists
Deaths from typhus
Jewish French writers
French people who died in Auschwitz concentration camp
Russian writers in French
French writers
Prix Renaudot winners
French civilians killed in World War II
20th-century French women writers
20th-century French novelists
Ukrainian Jews who died in the Holocaust
French Jews who died in the Holocaust
Emigrants from the Russian Empire to France
Infectious disease deaths in Poland